Masters of Persian Music is a Persian classical music ensemble (or "supergroup") founded in 2000 by four internationally recognized ustāds (masters) of the genre: vocalist Mohammad-Reza Shajarian; composer-musicians Hossein Alizâdeh and Kayhan Kalhor; and M. R. Shajarian's son, multi-instrumentalist singer Homayoun Shajarian.

The ensemble formed with a view to touring Europe and North America (where Kayhan Kalhor has lived for much of his adult life). Although not all of the four had collaborated previously, M. R. Shajarian had worked with Kalhor and Alizâdeh. In 1998 he sang for a studio album called Night, Silence, Desert, which Kalhor produced. He also sang the score that Alizâdeh composed for Ali Hatami's historical drama Del Shodegan (1992). Both albums were published on Delawaz Records, a label Shajarian started for the preservation of Persian classical singing.

Performances
Kalhor saw the group as cultural ambassadors. They adopted the name Masters of Persian Music for touring abroad. (In Iran, they perform and record under the own names.) The first European tour began in 2000, followed by a voyage to North America in early 2001. However, due to visa difficulties, Alizâdeh missed the first nine of the 18 performances in North America, and the other members had to play without him. Nevertheless, the success of the tour led to another in 2002 (organized by the World Music Institute), and a third in 2005. During this period, they released three live albums: Zemestan ast ("It's Winter") in 2001, Bi to be sar nemishavad ("Without You") in 2002, and the double album Faryad ("The Cry") in 2003.

It's Winter is a recording of the ensemble's first concert in California in 2001. The second album, Without You, was a nominee for the Grammy Award for Best Traditional World Music Album in the 46th Annual Grammy Awards. Faryad, recorded on a later tour, was nominated in 2005. 2005 also saw the release of Hamnava ba Bam, a DVD video of the ensemble's 2003 memorial and benefit concert in Tehran, which raised relief funds for survivors of the 2003 Bam earthquake. In 2007, Delawaz Records published the ensemble's two final live albums: Saz-e-khamoush and Soroode-e-mehr ( "October Song"). Between the concert tours, the members also continued to perform and record with other artists.

Hossein Alizâdeh and Kayhan Kalhor toured Europe and North America again in 2010. In Europe they were accompanied by tonbak player Majid Khalaj, but for the North American tour they enlisted the support of five younger musicians; promoters billed them as "Masters of Persian Music: Three Generations". This expanded ensemble included Hamid Reza Nourbakhsh (voice), Fariborz Azizi (bass tar), Siamak Jahangiry (ney), Pezhham Akhavass (tonbak), and Rouzbeh Rahimi (santur). Kalhor saw a need to reach out to younger Iranian musicians, since the Iranian Revolution of 1979 created a "generational divide" by widely barring music practice and performance—thus driving many musicians of the older generation out of the country. But the original lineup is also multi-generational: In 2005, M. R. Shajarian was age 62, Alizadeh 52, Kalhor 40, and H. Shajarian 28. Kalhor says that Iranians see the group as a symbol of continuity in the culture's traditions.

Tours of North America
The ensemble has visited at least 18 cities in the United States and Canada:

See also
 Music of Iran
 List of Iranian musicians

References

External links
 
 
 Masters of Persian Music at Last.fm
 Masters of Persian Music at Philpedia

Further reading
 
 

Persian classical music groups
Supergroups (music)